Chantiers de l'Atlantique is a shipyard in Saint-Nazaire, France. It is one of the world's largest shipyards, constructing a wide range of commercial, naval, and passenger ships. It is located near Nantes, at the mouth of the Loire river and the deep waters of the Atlantic, which make the sailing of large ships in and out of the shipyards easy.

The shipyard was owned by Alstom from 1976 onwards, became Alstom-Atlantique, and was later part of Aker Yards when Aker Group acquired the Alstom Marine business in 2006. In 2008, the South Korean company STX Corporation acquired Aker Yards, and the shipyard became part of STX Europe (formed by the renaming of Aker Yards).

After the bankruptcy of STX Corporation, the shipyard was acquired by the French government and reverted to its original name of Chantiers de l'Atlantique.

History

The current Chantiers de l'Atlantique yard evolved from the Ateliers et Chantiers de Saint-Nazaire Penhoët, Saint-Nazaire, France, famous for building the transatlantic liners: France, Ile de France, and Normandie.

It was renamed to its current name in 1955 by the merger of Ateliers et Chantiers de la Loire and Ateliers et Chantiers de Penhoët. In 1961, it built the transatlantic ocean liner , the world's longest passenger vessel only overall, but not at the waterline. After the construction of the last Compagnie Générale Transatlantique liner and the closure of the Suez Canal, the yard began building large tankers, including Batillus, Bellamya, Pierre Guillaumat and Prairial. A new dry dock was built for this purpose and allowed the construction of tankers exceeding one million tonnes, but it remained mainly unused except for the construction in 1975-1976 of the sister-ships MV Gastor and Nestor and then again idle until construction of Cunard's liner RMS Queen Mary 2.

Between 1985 and 1998, the shipyard built several cruise ships for Royal Caribbean Cruise Line (RCCL). In 1987 the first of these ships, Sovereign of the Seas, was delivered, and was the first mega cruise ship in the world. Subsequent deliveries to RCCL included Monarch of the Seas, Majesty of the Seas, Nordic Empress, Legend of the Seas, Splendour of the Seas, Rhapsody of the Seas, and Vision of the Seas. In 2003, the shipyard also delivered Crystal Serenity to Crystal Cruises and RMS Queen Mary 2 to Cunard Line.  During the construction of RMS Queen Mary 2, a gangway to the dry-docked ship collapsed, killing sixteen people.

On 4 January 2006 Aker Yards purchased the Marine Division of Alstom, which included the Chantiers de l'Atlantique shipyard. In March 2007 Aker ASA divested its interest in Aker Yards, with South Korean STX Corporation acquiring a 39.2% stake in Aker Yards in October. By 3 November 2008 STX Corporation had acquired a controlling stake in the company, renaming it to STX Europe. The same year, the French government purchased a 33.34% stake in the shipyard.

After the bankruptcy of STX Corporation in 2016, STX France was put up for sale, and the Italian state-owned shipyard Fincantieri showed interest in acquiring STX France.

In September 2017, after difficult negotiations and a brief nationalization of the shipyard by the French government, the involved parties reached an agreement, with Fincantieri acquiring a 50% stake in STX France, and the remainder being held by the French Naval Group and the French government. A month later, it was announced that the Saint-Nazaire shipyard would regain its original name, Chantiers de l'Atlantique.

In 2022, a new crane entered service during the construction of the Celebrity Ascent, replacing the older crane from 1967.

Ships 
Notable passenger liners built by at the Chantiers de l'Atlantique yard(former Ateliers et Chantiers de Saint-Nazaire Penhoët) include:

Other ships built at the yard:

 Sans Souci class - 4 sloops, designed as seaplane tenders, but built as escorts. all launched in 1940.
 The BELLE ABETO - Built 1952 as LAENNEC 66 BELLE ABETO Passenger/cargo Ship.
 Batillus class supertankers - Four ships launched (1976-1979)
  and MV|Nestor - Two LNG carriers built in 1975-1977 for the Dutch NSU (later Nedlloyd) and Ocean Group (later owned by Bonny Gas Transport). The large drydock, which was later used for the Queen Mary 2, was specially built for the building of supertankers in the 1970s, among which were these two ships. The drydock was never used again until the QM2 was being built.
  - Brittany Ferries ship that operates between Portsmouth and St Malo, was launched in 1989.
 KOGO - Completed by Alstom in May 2006. It was a yacht owned by Mansour Ojjeh, who also part-owns the McLaren Formula One team. KOGO has been used by Lewis Hamilton and the yacht has an on-board gym and Jacuzzi.
 MS Baltic Princess - A part of it was launched in 2008.
 Russian amphibious assault ship Vladivostok - Later purchased by Egypt.
 Russian amphibious assault ship Sevastopol - Later purchased by Egypt.
Future ships on order:

References

External links

 

Shipyards of France
Aker ASA
Saint-Nazaire
1861 establishments in France
 
Buildings and structures in Loire-Atlantique